Zoe-Gbao District is one of 17 districts of Nimba County, Liberia. As of 2008, the population was 29,372.

References

 

Districts of Liberia
Nimba County